Tatiana Verge (born 24 January 1977; née Vattier) is a French badminton player, also play for the Issy-les-Moulineaux and Racing Club de France, Paris. She competed at the 2000 Summer Olympics in Sydney, Australia. Vattier had won 10 times National Championships, 4 in the women's singles, 4 in the women's doubles, and 2 in the mixed doubles event.

Achievements

IBF International 
Women's singles

Women's doubles

Mixed doubles

References

External links 
 
 

1977 births
Living people
People from Sainte-Adresse
Sportspeople from Seine-Maritime
French female badminton players
Badminton players at the 2000 Summer Olympics
Olympic badminton players of France